Sen o Warszawie ("Dream About Warsaw") is a compilation of Czesław Niemen's first singles. All songs were remastered in 1995.

The song Sen o Warszawie is the anthem of the football club Legia Warszawa, being sung by fans before every match.

Track listing 
"Adieu Tristesse"
"El soldado"
"Teach Me How to Twist"
"Locomotion"
"Tylko nie mów mi o tym"
"Wiem, że nie wrócisz"
"Czy mnie jeszcze pamiętasz?"
"Czas jak rzeka"
"Jak można wierzyć tylko słowom"
"Ach jakie oczy"
"Ptaki śpiewają - kocham"
"Nie bądź taki Bitels"
"Zabawa w ciuciubabkę"
"Hippy Hippy Shake"
"Stoję w oknie"
"Jeszcze sen"
"Czy wiesz o tym że"
"Sen o Warszawie"
"Być może i ty"
"Hej dziewczyno hej"

Personnel 

Jerzy Kossela - guitar
Krzysztof Klenczon - guitar
Janusz Popławski- guitar
Henryk Zomerski - bass
Zbigniew Bernolak - bass
Jerzy Kowalski - drums
Andrzej Nebeski - drums
Daniel Danielowski - piano
Zbigniew Pogdajn - piano
Włodzimierz Wander - tenor saxophone
Bernard Dornowski, Marek Szczepkowski, Adriana Rusowicz, Maria Wit, Urszula Dziecielska - background vocals
Czesław Niemen - vocal, harmonica, violin, guitar

References 

Czesław Niemen compilation albums
1995 compilation albums